The coat of arms of the Angevin dynasty varied over time, but always included a lion.

The first historical coat of arms is that of Geoffrey Plantagenet, Count of Anjou, depicted as azure, six lions rampant or (or gules)).

In 1340, Edward III of England adopted gules, three lions  passants guardants  or as the Royal Arms of England. Based on this, later attributions have associated the Angevin Empire and its territories, especially the Duchy of Normandy and the Duchy of Aquitaine with the blazon gules, a lion passant guardant or. These attributed arms are not to be confused with the historical coat of arms borne by the Capetian House of Anjou created by Louis IX of France for his brother for Charles I of Naples in 1247.

The two lions were attributed retrospectively to Henry II, and they were described as the  "flag of Normandy" by Meurgey (1941).

In 2010, Monnaie de Paris issued a 10 Euro coin with this design as representing the region of Aquitaine (Guyenne).

See also
Angevin kings of England
Armorial of Plantagenet
Counts and dukes of Anjou

References

Coat of arms
Angevin